Kerala is a state in south-western India. Most of Kerala's 34.8 million people (in 2011) are ethnically Malayalis (Malayalam speakers). Most of the Malayalam and English speaking Keralites derive their ancestry from Dravidian communities that settled in Kerala. Additional ancestries derive from millennia of trade links across the Arabian Sea, whereby people of Arab, Jewish, Syrian and other ethnicities settled in Kerala. Many of these immigrants intermarried with native Malayalam speakers resulting in formation of many Muslims and Christians in Kerala. Some Muslims and Christians thus take lineage from Middle Eastern settlers mixed with local population.

Malayalam is Kerala's official language and is spoken by at least 97% of the people of Kerala; the next most common languages are English and Tamil which is spoken mainly by migrant workers from the neighbouring state of Tamil Nadu. Tulu and Kannada is spoken in northern parts of Kasaragod district, bordering Karnataka. In addition, Kerala is home to 321,000 indigenous tribal Adivasis (1.10% of the populace). Some 63% of tribals reside in the eastern districts of Wayanad (where 35.82% are tribals), Palakkad (1.02%), and Idukki (15.66%). These groups, including the Paniyars, Mooppans, Irulars, Kurumbars, and Mudugars, speak their own native languages. Cholanaikkan tribe in the Silent Valley National Park were contacted only in the 1970s and they are the most isolated tribe in the state.

Population

Kerala is home to 2.76% of India's population, and at 859 persons per km2; its land is three times as densely settled as the rest of India. Kerala's western coastal regions are the most densely settled with population of 2,022 persons per km2, 2.5 times the overall population density of the state, 859 persons per km2, leaving the eastern hills and mountains comparatively sparsely populated. However, Kerala's population growth rate is far lower than the national average, although Kerala's population more than doubled between 1951 and 1991 – adding 15.6 million people to reach a total of 29.1 million residents in 1991 – the population stood at 31.8 million by 2001 and 33.3 million in 2011. Kerala's people are most densely settled in the coastal region, leaving the eastern hills and mountains comparatively sparsely populated. Kerala is the second-most urbanised major state in the country with 47.7% urban population according to the 2011 Census of India.

Hinduism is followed by the majority of Keralites (54.7%). The major religions followed in Kerala are Hinduism (54.7% — Hinduism in Kerala), Islam (26.6%) and Christianity (18.4%).

Kerala also had a tiny Jewish population until recently, said to date from 587 BC when they fled the occupation of Jerusalem by Nebuchadnezzar. The 2001 Indian census recorded only 51 Jews in Kerala. The synagogue in Kochi is the oldest in the Commonwealth of Nations.

The state has many famous temples, mosques, and churches. The oldest church in India is found in Kerala, believed to be established by St. Thomas, the disciple of Jesus Christ and the Cheramaan Juma Mosque is considered to be the oldest mosque in the Indian subcontinent which was built by an Islamic missionary Malik Dinar.

Population graph of Kerala from 1910 to 2011 

Source:

Features

Social development
Kerala ranks highest in India with respect to social development indices such as elimination of poverty, primary education and healthcare. This resulted from significant efforts begun in 1911 by the erstwhile Princely states of Cochin and Travancore to boost healthcare and education among the people and aided by the Christian missionaries. This central focus – deemed unusual in India – was then maintained after Kerala's post-independence inauguration as a state. Thus, Kerala has the highest literacy rate in India of 93.91% (2011); and life expectancy is now the highest in India. The suicide rates in Kerala are the highest in India. As per the 2011 census, Kerala and Puducherry are the only domiciles in India with a female-to-male ratio higher than 0.99. The ratio for Kerala is 1.084 – 1084 females per 1000 males – while the national figure is 0.940. It is also one of the states in India to have sub-replacement fertility.

UNICEF and the World Health Organization (WHO) designated Kerala as the world's first "baby-friendly state" via its "Baby Friendly Hospital Initiative". The state is also known for Ayurveda, a traditional system of medicine – this traditional expertise is currently drawing increasing numbers of medical tourists. However, drawbacks to this situation includes the population's steady ageing – indeed, 11.2% of Keralites are age 60 or over.

Kerala's unusual socioeconomic and demographic situation was summarised by author and environmentalist Bill McKibben:

Expatriation and Emigration
As of 2011, a total of 2,280,000 Keralites reside outside India. Largest populations are found in UAE (883,313) and USA (680,076).

The major concentrations of expat Keralites are in the following nations: (figures as of 2011)

 UAE – 883,313
 United States – 680,076 (mainly U.S. Citizens)
 KSA – 574,739
 Oman – 195,300
 Qatar – 410,000
 Kuwait – 127,782
 Bahrain – 216,000
 United Kingdom – 44,640
 Canada – 28,000
 Australia – 50,000
 Portugal – 2,000
 Italy – 25,000
 Germany – 10,000

Diversity
There are more than 2,500,000 migrants living in Kerala, mostly from Assam and West Bengal, constituting more than 8% of the population. There are also migrants from Bihar, Jharkhand, Chhattisgarh, Orissa, and the North East.

Studies indicate that by the time of 2026 state elections, migrants will become a crucial voting block in many of the constituencies in Thiruvananthapuram, Kollam, Kochi, Kozhikode, Thrissur and Kannur districts.

Lists

Urban centres
According to 2011 Census of India, Kerala has six 1.5 million-plus urban agglomerations: Kochi, Kozhikode, Thrissur, Malappuram, Thiruvananthapuram, and Kannur, all of which has a population of at least 1.5 million. Over a third of Keralites live in these large cities (a higher percentage than any other state), and over half the population lives in urban centres.

The above table lists Kerala cities in terms of their respective corporation statistics.

According to the 2011 Census, 7 of the top 50 most populous metropolitan areas in India belong to Kerala. They are Kochi, Kozhikode, Thrissur, Malappuram, Thiruvananthapuram, Kannur and Kollam ranking 17, 19, 21, 25, 26, 27 and 48 respectively.

The surprising aspect in these corporation numbers are that Kochi Corporation, despite being inside the state's largest urban agglomeration, is only the 2nd most populous and 4th largest in terms of area in the state. This anomaly is because the corporation limits have not been updated since its formation in 1967, and thus expansion of these outdated limits has become a big demand in Kochi.

However, since cities are ranked in terms of their Urban Agglomeration statistics and not in terms of Local self governing bodies statistics (as seen in the Ministry of Housing and Urban Affairs (MOHUA) official rankings), Kochi secures the number 1 spot in the state in terms of largest cities as one can observe below.

Most populous urban agglomerations

The following is a list of most populous urban agglomerations in the Kerala state of India. Population statistics indicated are as of 2011 census.

(Note that this is a list of metropolitan (UA) population and does not indicate the corporation populations. Cities in India are officially ranked in terms of these numbers)

Ethnic groups

The vast majority of residents of Kerala are Malayalis, but there are many smaller ethnic groups including Tuluvas, Tamils, Kannadigas and Konkanis. In addition, as of early 2013 there are close to 2.5 million (7.5% of state population) migrant workers from other states of India in Kerala.

Language

Kerala is the most unilingual state of India in which about 97% of the total population speak Malayalam as their Native language. In addition, there is a significant Tamil population in Idukki district, which accounts for 17.48% of its total population. Tulu and Kannada are spoken in the northern portions of Kasaragod district, each of which account for 8.77% and 4.23% of total population in the district respectively.

Religion

Hindus constitute 54.7% of the population of Kerala, followed by Islam with 26.6% population and Christianity at third with 18.4% population as per 2011 census.

Religious demographics of Travancore (1816–1941)

Sources:

Religious Demographics of Malabar District (1871–1951)

Sources:

Communities

Castes of Kerala 

The Scheduled Caste (SC) population of Kerala State is 3,123,941 which is 9.8% of overall population. Scheduled Tribes in Kerala, with a population of 364,000, constitute 1.14% of the population.

Denominations groups among Christians:

Catholic church (Syrian and Latin rites) is the largest denomination among Kerala Christians. Malankara orthodox church, Jacobite Syrian orthodox church and Marthomite Syrian church denominations claim Syrian roots. Major Protestant groups include Church of South India (CSI), various Pentecostal churches. Chaldean Syrian, Seventh Day Adventists, Salvation Army are some other denominations.

Tribal communities

Kerala has approximately 35 distinct scheduled tribes that constitute 1.3% of the population. Though entirely unique, their languages are often not highlighted as distinct in the census. The Paniyan, who are the numerically dominant tribe, live in north east of the state and practice settled cultivation. The Kattunaikan, Kurichian and Kuruman belong to the same region. Palleyan, Palliyan and Palliyar inhabit the Idukki region not far from the Anamalai and Palani hills of Tamil Nadu where you find the same population. The Kadar, Irular, Kurumbas, Maha malasar and Malasar inhabit the Palghat region close to their counterparts in Niligiri and Anamalai hills of Tamil Nadu. The same is the case of the Kudiya and Koraga living in the northern most tip of the state next to Kodagu and Dakshina Kannada region of Karnataka.

Age structure 

(2011 census)
0–6 years: 9.95% 
7–14 years: 23.9%
15–59 years: 54.3%
60 years and over:12.8%

Urbanisation

Birth rate

Source: Kerala Department of Economics and Statistics | Vital statistics

Birth data by religion

17.1 births/1,000 population (1994–2001 est.)

Birth Rate was 17.1 in 1994–2001 (20.3 in 1984–1990 & 25.0 in 1974–1980). Pathanamthitta (14.5 in 1994–2001, 17.2 in 1984–1990 & NA in 1974–1980) had the lowest TBR and Malappuram(22.4, 29.5 & 33.6) had the highest TBR.

According to the 2011 Census, Thiruvalla taluk has the lowest birth rate and Tirurangadi taluk has the highest birth rate.

Lowest Birth Rate (2011):
 Thiruvalla – 10.63 per 1,000
 Mallappally – 10.69 per 1,000
 Kozhenchery – 10.86 per 1,000
 Chengannur – 10.93 per 1,000
 Adoor – 11.09 per 1,000

Highest Birth Rate (2011):
 Tirurangadi – 19.99 per 1,000
 Ernad – 19.68 per 1,000
 Perinthalmanna – 19.43 per 1,000
 Tirur – 19.16 per 1,000
 Nilambur – 18.34 per 1,000

Vital stats for the year 2011:

In 2007, 61.55% of the deaths were reported from Hindus, 17.50% from Muslims and, 19.75% from Christians.
 In 2008, 61.01% of the deaths were reported from Hindus, 17.82% from Muslims and, 20.06% from Christians.
 In 2010, 60.79% of the deaths were reported from Hindus, 18.31% from Muslims and, 20.36% from Christians.
 In 2011, 60.45% of the deaths were reported from Hindus, 18.48% from Muslims and, 20.56% from Christians.
 In 2018, 60.54% of the deaths were reported from Hindus, 19.15% from Muslims and, 19.86% from Christians.

Net migration rate
 (-)3.1 migrant(s)/1,000 population (1991 est.)

Of the emigrants from Kerala, 42.2% were Muslims, 36.6% were Hindus and 21.2% were Christians in 1992–93. The most preferred destination was Saudi Arabia (37.8%), followed by UAE (25.9%), Other Gulf countries (13.0%), Oman (11.8%), Other Countries (7.5%) and USA(3.8%).

Sex ratio
According to the 2011 census, women outnumber men in all the districts of Kerala with the highest proportion in Kannur and Pathanamthitta districts.

Vital statistics

Life expectancy at birth 
Life expectancy at birth is 78 years.

In 1991, Kerala had the lowest TFR (Children born per women) in the whole of India. Hindus had a TFR of 1.66, Christians had 1.78 and Muslims had 2.97. In 2000, the TFR was 1.73 with Muslims having 2.28, Nairs having a TFR of 1.47 and Syrian Christians having TFR of 1.55. TFR for Scheduled Castes was 1.52 in 1997–98 and 1.37 in 1992–93. The lowest Fertility rate recorded anywhere in India is TFR of 1.17 for Vettuvan caste in Kerala.

As per the 2011 Census, the fertility rate per community is as Hindu: 1.544 children per woman, Muslim: 2.351 and Christian: 1.716. For SC, the fertility is 1.485 and for ST, it is 1.629.

For Hindus, the TFR is highest in Wayanad (1.710) and lowest in Thiruvananthapuram (1.435). For the Muslims, it is Kannur (2.779) and Pathanamthitta (1.707), while for the Christians the respective districts are Kasaragod (1.929) and Kollam (1.539).

See also
 Non-Municipal Census Towns in Kerala
 Demographics of Malabar
 Demographics of Travancore
 History of Kerala
 Geography of Kerala
 Economy of Kerala
 Kerala Gulf diaspora
 Migrant labourers in Kerala
 Unemployment in Kerala

References

 
 
 
 

Kerala
Kerala-related lists